Nakhon Phanom province is one of Thailand's seventy-six provinces (changwat) lies in upper northeastern Thailand also called Isan. Directly adjacent provinces are (from south clockwise): Mukdahan, Sakon Nakhon, and Bueng Kan. To the northeast it borders Khammouan of Laos.

Geography
The province, in the Mekong River valley, is mostly plains. The northern part of the province has a more upland, forest-covered character. The main river in the northern part is the Songkhram River with the smaller Oun River. The southern part is flatter with the Kum River as its only notable watercourse. The provincial capital, the city of Nakhon Phanom, is on the banks of the Mekong.

National parks
There are two national parks, along with five other national parks, make up region 10 (Udon Thani) of Thailand's protected areas. 
 Phu Pha Yon National Park, 
 Phu Langka National Park,  and includes the Tat Kham and Tat Pho waterfalls as its most popular attractions. Flowers such as the Lady Slipper Orchid and diverse wildlife are found in the park.

History
The name Nakhon Phanom, meaning 'city of mountains', was given to the city by King Rama I. There are no mountains within Nakhon Phanom itself, the limestone mountains being concentrated in the city of Thakhek in Laos on the other side of the Mekong River. Nakhon Phanom is more accurately described as a city where mountains can be seen.

The area had been long settled by Lao people and belonged to the Lan Xang Kingdom. After it came under the control of the Kingdom of Ayutthaya, the population remained predominantly Lao speaking. At first it was known as Si Khottrabun, and during the reign of King Rama I was called Marukkhanakhon.

During the Vietnam War Nakhon Phanom saw fighting between North Vietnamese insurgents and US forces. During the 1960s, 73 of the 131 sub-district (tambons) were allegedly infiltrated by the Vietnamese and Lao communists, and the province was known as the "heartland of insurgency". US and Thai forces established a base at Nakhon Phanom, where the Thai military hosted the 56th Air Commando Wing, which conducted special operations against both the Ho Chi Minh Trail in Laos and carried out counter-insurgency operations against Thai communist forces while conducting search and rescue operations primarily inside Laos and North Vietnam.

On 7 August 1965, an ethnic Phu Thai village in the province, made headlines when Thailand's first-ever physical confrontation between communist fighters and Thai security forces occurred. Eight communist villagers were involved, one of whom was shot dead during the incident after the town was surrounded by state forces.

Between 1967 and 1971, most of the communist insurgents were defeated. Towards the end of the Vietnam War, US forces moved their Indochinese military operations to Nakhon Phanom.

Vietnamese communist leader Ho Chi Minh had resided from 1928 and 1931 in Ban Nachok, a small village on the road between what is now the airbase and Nakhon Phanom. His former home and a museum are open to the public.

Symbols
The provincial seal shows the pagoda of Phra That Phanom in That Phanom District. Originally constructed around 535 BCE in Khmer-style, it collapsed in 1675 and was rebuilt in Lao-style. The provincial tree, as well as flower, is Fagraea fragrans.

The provincial slogan is "The city of the revered Phrathat Phanom, cultural diversity, beautiful Phutai people, brilliant illuminated boat procession and picturesque Mekong River".

Culture

Important festivals in the province include the traditional dances of the Phu Thai ethnic group held in May and June every year. The Phra That Phanom temple fair is held every February, when many locals visit the temple to pay homage. At the end of the Buddhist Lent in November, an illuminated boat procession takes place.

The cuisine is similar to that of Laos as the Lao make up the ethnic and cultural majority through centuries of Laotian rule. Padaek or Pla ra, fermented, preserved fish, originally comes from the Si Songkhram area is now popular throughout Thailand.

Traditional products in the province include hand-woven fabric, made from silk or cotton. Renu Nakhon, That Phanom, and Si Songkhram Districts are the centers of this industry. Also hand-made khene instruments are made in the province.

Economy

Special Economic Zone
, a commercial mixed-use project with a hotel, sports complex, healthcare and trade exhibition center, respectively, and other facilities is being constructed on a 1,335 rai site near the third Thai-Lao Friendship Bridge and Nakhon Phanom checkpoint. It is one of ten special economic zones (SEZ) to be built throughout the country.

Tourism
The province derives little income from tourism. According to government officials, roughly 1.2 million tourists visited in 2017, of which only 10 percent of them were foreigners. The province projects tourist arrivals to reach more than 1.5 million in 2018.

Administrative divisions

Provincial government
The province is divided into 12 districts (amphoes). The districts are further divided into 97 subdistricts (tambons) and 1,040 villages (mubans).

Local government
As of 26 November 2019 there are: one Nakhon Phanom Provincial Administration Organisation and 22 municipal (thesaban) areas in the province. Nakhon Phanom has town (thesaban mueang) status. Further 21 subdistrict municipalities (thesaban tambon). The non-municipal areas are administered by 81 Subdistrict Administrative Organisations - SAO (ongkan borihan suan tambon).

Education
The town is home to Nakhon Phanom University, formed in 2005 by the merger of several local schools including the former Nakhon Phanom Rajabhat University.

Transport

Roads
Route 212 runs from Nong Khai along the Mekong River through Nakhon Phanom to Mukdahan, and then south to Ubon Ratchathani. Route 22 leads west through Sakhon Nakhon to Udon Thani.

Air
Nakhon Phanom is served by Nakhon Phanom Airport, located four kilometers west of town.

Human achievement index 2017

Since 2003, United Nations Development Programme (UNDP) in Thailand has tracked progress on human development at sub-national level using the Human achievement index (HAI), a composite index covering all the eight key areas of human development. National Economic and Social Development Board (NESDB) has taken over this task since 2017.

Gallery

External links

Provincial website
Tourist Authority of Thailand

Mekong river level critically low (8 March 2021) Bangkok Post
Nakhon Phanom During The Secret War 1962-1975

References 

 
Isan
Provinces of Thailand
Populated places on the Mekong River